The Two Reds is a 1950 picture book written by William Lipkind under the name Will and illustrated by Nicholas Mordvinoff under the name Nicholas. The book is a story of a red-haired boy and a red cat. The book was a recipient of a 1951 Caldecott Honor for its illustrations.

References

1950 children's books
American picture books
Caldecott Honor-winning works